The 1885–86 FAW Welsh Cup was the ninth edition of the annual knockout tournament for competitive football teams in Wales.

First round

Replays

Second round

Replays

Third round

Replays

Semifinals

Replays

Final

References

Bibliography

Notes 

 The History of the Welsh Cup 1877-1993 by Ian Garland (1991) 
 Welsh Football Data Archive

1885-86
1885–86 domestic association football cups